Aneta is a feminine given name, a Slavic variant of Annette. Notable people with the name include:

Aneta Corsaut (1933–1995), American actress
Aneta Kowalska (born 1982), Polish pair skater
Aneta Kręglicka (born 1965), Polish dancer, Miss World 1989
Aneta Langerová (born 1986), Czech singer
Aneta Lemiesz (born 1981), Polish runner
Aneta Michałek (born 1991), Polish pair skater
Aneta Pastuszka (born 1978), Polish canoer
Aneta Soukup (born 1978), Canadian tennis player

Feminine given names